Rhinoncus is a genus of weevil. It includes Rhinoncus castor, Rhinoncus bruchoides, Rhinoncus occidentalis, Rhinoncus pericarpius (Linné, 1758), Rhinoncus perpendicularis, Rhinoncus pyrrhopus,  Rhinoncus scoliasus, Rhinoncus squamipennis and others. They consume polygonaceae.

References 

Baridinae genera